Nathan Broad (born 15 April 1993) is a professional Australian rules footballer playing for the Richmond Football Club in the Australian Football League (AFL). He is a three-time premiership player with the club, winning in 2017, 2019 and 2020.

Junior and state league football
Broad hails from the Western Australian town of Wubin, 272 kilometres north-east of Perth. He played the majority of his junior football with the Chittering Broncos Junior Football Club, then Upper Swan Junior Football club, before moving to Perth at age 16 to join the Swan Districts development program.
While in Perth he attended Governor Stirling High School on a sports scholarship.

In 2011 he was a member of the Western Australian squad, but did not play a game at the 2011 AFL Under 18 Championships. However, he  was not drafted in the 2011 pool and returned to play state league football in the Western Australian Football League. He did so for four years including playing 20 matches with Swan Districts in 2015, while averaging 20 disposals per game in a rebounding defensive role. He finished fourth in the club's best and fairest award that year and began receiving the attention of AFL scouts. He attended the state draft combine in October 2015 and recorded a time of 24.04 seconds in the repeat sprint (faster than any player in who attended the national combine) and the state combine's third-best beep test score (14.1).

AFL career

2016 season

He first represented Richmond in a pre-season match against  in his home state, playing a dual role as a general and rebounding defender. Despite this, and an all-around impressive pre-season, he would be restrained to playing with the Richmond's reserves side in the VFL for much of his first season at the club. He eventually made his AFL debut in round 14 of the 2016 AFL season against Brisbane in a home game at the MCG. He had been named as an emergency for the match but was called in to play after teammate Jake Batchelor was removed due to injury. He recorded 14 disposals and five marks on debut. Broad played in the club's next match as well, before being dropped and returning to VFL level for the rest of the season. He finished the year having played just the two matches at senior level.

2017 season

For the second straight year Broad started the 2017 season without gaining AFL selection. Just days before the VFL season was to start though he suffered an AC joint injury in his right shoulder while training in April 2017. He was subsequently added to the club's long-term injury list and missed eight weeks of football at all levels as a result. He returned to play for the club's reserve side in the VFL in early June. After showing good form at VFL level he was called up to AFL action in round 17. He remained in the side for the rest of the home and away season, holding averages of 15.1 disposals and 4.3 marks per game over this stretch. In the first week of the finals Broad contributed 15 disposals and eight marks towards Richmond's win over  before helping shut down GWS forward Toby Greene in the preliminary final two weeks later. From there, Broad's side played off against minor premiers  in the 2017 AFL Grand Final. He kept his direct opponent Tom Lynch goalless, while contributing 13 disposals of his own to Richmond's 48 point victory. As a result, he won a premiership medal in his tenth game that season and twelfth of his career.

2018 season
In the month following his side's 2017 premiership win, Broad was embroiled in scandal for distributing a photograph of a nude woman without consent, the result of which saw him suspended for the first three matches of the 2018 AFL season. He did however play in one pre-season series match with the club as well as in Richmond's side at the Sydney tournament of the AFLX exhibition series in February. Broad played with the club's reserves team in the VFL during the period of his suspension as well as in one further match, before being re-called to senior level in round 5. Broad suffered a corked glute muscle in the lead up to Richmond's round 9 match against , but ultimately played in the match despite the injury. At the mid-season bye, Broad had not missed a game since his return to AFL level, while holding averages of 10.6 disposals and three marks per game. That injury required surgery to repair and caused him to miss one match. Broad played two consecutive matches upon his return, but was rested in round 20 due to calf soreness. That performance, along with consecutive four disposal games to close out the home and away season, saw Broad's continuing selection under some media speculation.

2019 season

Broad was tipped to fall out of Richmond's best 22 by AFL Media in the summer before the 2019 season, though strong performances in each of the club's two pre-season matches would ultimately earn him selection in round 1's season-opening match against . The loss of All-Australian defender and teammate Alex Rance to an ACL injury in that match however, would force Broad into a more defensive role than in seasons past. After 11 matches, Broad was one of just six players to appear in all Richmond matches that season. That run was not to continue into round 12 however, after was Broad was dropped back to VFL football for the first time since the start of 2018. It was a short stint at that level, immediately recalled to AFL football in round 13. Broad played in his 50th career AFL match in round 22 during that run, passing that mark to claim the best winning percentage (80 per cent) of any active AFL player with 50 or more games played. Broad was again subdued offensively but strong defensively in the first half of the preliminary final against . In the second half however, Broad suffered a head knock and concussion that saw him removed from the remainder of the match as his teammates won through to a grand final match up against . In the week that followed, he was the subject of intense media speculation around his fitness to play including revelations that Broad suffered memory loss covering the entirety of the preliminary final. Broad passed all concussion tests later that week and was ultimately selected to play in the grand final where he and the Richmond defence kept the Giants to 25 points, their lowest score in the club's eight-year history and the lowest score by any team in a VFL/AFL grand final since 1960. According to AFL Media, Broad "played his role superbly" while directly defending Harry Himmelberg. Broad finished the year having played a career-best 24 matches, winning a second AFL premiership in three seasons and placing 16th in the club's best and fairest count.

2020 season
The 2019/20 off-season retirement of fellow defender Alex Rance assured Broad he would continue to be a key part his club's defensive unit, which he showed with strong performances in the pre-season series including with 21 disposals in the first of those two matches. Broad earned AFL selection for a round 1 win over Carlton when the season began a fortnight later, but under extraordinary conditions imposed on the league as a result of the rapid progression of the coronavirus pandemic into Australia. In what the league planned would be the first of a reduced 17-round season, the match was played without crowds in attendance due to public health prohibitions on large gatherings and with quarter lengths reduced by one fifth in order to reduce the physical load on players who would be expected to play multiple matches with short breaks in the second half of the year. Just three days later, the AFL Commission suspended the season for an indefinite period after multiple states enforced quarantine conditions on their borders that effectively ruled out the possibility of continuing the season as planned. Broad had ten disposals when the season resumed with a draw against  in early-June after an 11-week hiatus. In early July, Broad moved with the main playing group when the club was relocated to the Gold Coast in response to a virus outbreak in Melbourne. He was a senior mainstay over the next seven matches, but was omitted from the club's round 13 match against . Despite a good performance in the win, Broad was dropped upon the recovery of Grimes after just one match. Instead, he would play in unofficial scratch matches against opposition reserves players given the cancellation of the formal reserves VFL competition. AFL Media labelled his intercept marking and other defensive efforts as "crucial to the win" in the absence of injured teammate Nick Vlastuin. Officially, Broad was awarded two Norm Smith Medal votes for his eight disposal performance in the win, through selector Leigh Matthews later clarified he had mistaken entered Broad's name while intending to vote for fellow defender Jayden Short.

2021 season
He was in career-best form through that point of the season, averaging 15.9 disposals, 7.3 intercepts and 276 metres gained per match. Four weeks later and following a round 11 performance against  that earned him a mention in Richmond's best players by AFL Media, Broad ranked second at Richmond with seven intercepts per game that season. Around the same time, Broad was labelled a contender for the club's best and fairest award by AFL Media and was identified as his club's second most improved player that season by AFL statistical provider Champion Data. Broad suffered an ankle injury early in round 15's match against , but returned to play out the remainder of the loss despite the injury. Scans later revealed a significant syndesmosis ankle injury, which would require surgery to repair and which would rule him out for at least one month of football. He had returned to running in mid July and was considered some chance to return to match-play by the end of the month, travelling with an extended squad to an away game in Perth. Though he ultimately went unselected for that round 20 match against , he was labelled as a probable inclusion for the following week's match. His return was ultimately thwarted by an injury setback, with a follow-up scan showing he would require further rehabilitation. With the club not qualifying for the final series, the diagnoses would effectively end his season in which he featured in 14 matches and set new career highs for disposals (16.4) and marks (6.4) per game.

Player profile
Broad plays as a versatile defender, capable of directly defending small and tall forwards or playing as a spare interceptor, but with particular skills as a rebounder from half-back. He is notable for his repeat sprint and endurance running ability.

Statistics
Updated to the end of round 23, 2022.

|-
| 2016
|
| 35 || 2 || 0 || 0 || 15 || 11 || 26 || 7 || 3 || 0.0 || 0.0 || 7.5 || 5.5 || 13.0 || 3.5 || 1.5 || 0
|-
| scope=row bgcolor=F0E68C | 2017#
|
| 35 || 10 || 0 || 0 || 93 || 47 || 140 || 41 || 25 || 0.0 || 0.0 || 9.3 || 4.7 || 14.0 || 4.1 || 2.5 || 0
|-
| 2018
|
| 35 || 18 || 0 || 0 || 117 || 73 || 190 || 55 || 40 || 0.0 || 0.0 || 6.5 || 4.1 || 10.6 || 3.1 || 2.2 || 0
|-
| scope=row bgcolor=F0E68C | 2019#
|
| 35 || 24 || 1 || 0 || 165 || 106 || 271 || 86 || 44 || 0.0 || 0.0 || 6.9 || 4.4 || 11.3 || 3.6 || 1.8 || 0
|-
| scope=row bgcolor=F0E68C | 2020#
|
| 35 || 16 || 0 || 0 || 128 || 47 || 175 || 65 || 28 || 0.0 || 0.0 || 8.0 || 2.9 || 10.9 || 4.1 || 1.8 || 0
|-
| 2021
|
| 35 || 14 || 0 || 0 || 159 || 70 || 229 || 89 || 17 || 0.0 || 0.0 || 11.4 || 5.0 || 16.4 || 6.4 || 1.2 || 0
|-
| 2022
|
| 35 || 22 || 0 || 0 || 273 || 121 || 394 || 136 || 26 || 0.0 || 0.0 || 12.4 || 5.5 || 17.9 || 6.2 || 1.2 || 1
|- class="sortbottom"
! colspan=3| Career
! 106
! 1
! 0
! 950
! 475
! 1425
! 479
! 183
! 0.0
! 0.0
! 9.0
! 4.5
! 13.4
! 4.5
! 1.7
! 1
|}

Notes

Honours and achievements
Team
 3x AFL premiership player: 2017, 2019, 2020
 McClelland Trophy: 2018

Personal life
Broad began a relationship with Love Island Australia season 1 winner Tayla Damir in late 2019. The pair were engaged in June 2021.

Nude photo controversy
In the days following Richmond's 2017 AFL premiership victory, a nude photograph of a woman's torso wearing a player's premiership medal surfaced on various social media websites. At the behest of the woman involved, Victoria Police began an investigation into its alleged unlawful distribution. No charges were ultimately pursued, however, after the woman dropped her complaint, with a later press statement from her lawyers explaining she had initially contacted police to seek assistance in having the photo destroyed, that she did not intend for criminal charges to be laid and that the claim was now being dropped to "protect her identity and avoid any further attention and distress." The same statement said that the woman and player had a previous relationship and that "she insisted he delete the photo from his mobile phone as soon as it was taken, and that he assured her it had been."

Broad, alongside club president Peggy O'Neal, held a press conference on 30 October 2017 where it was revealed that the photograph in question had been taken by Broad. In a pre-prepared statement he publicly apologised and admitted to having sent the photo to other people without the woman's consent. In a move supported by the AFL, Broad was suspended by the club for the first three matches of the following AFL season over his actions, subsequently ending the league's investigation into the matter.

References

External links

Nathan Broad's statistics from Footy Wire

Living people
1993 births
Richmond Football Club players
Richmond Football Club Premiership players
Swan Districts Football Club players
Australian rules footballers from Western Australia
Three-time VFL/AFL Premiership players